Mikinduni is a settlement in Tana River County with the nearest major city being the city of Bura.

References 

Populated places in Coast Province